Dinak (also Romanized as Dīnak; also known as Dīngeh and Denīnak) is a village in Ilat-e Qaqazan-e Sharqi Rural District, Kuhin District, Qazvin County, Qazvin Province, Iran. At the 2006 census, its population was 39, in 11 families.

References 

Populated places in Qazvin County